Horst Morokutti is an Austrian para-alpine skier and cross-country skier. He represented Austria at four Winter Paralympics and, in total, he won one gold medal, four silver medals and one bronze medal.

Career 

He represented Austria in alpine skiing at the 1976 Winter Paralympics and at the 1980 Winter Paralympics. He also represented Austria in cross-country skiing at the 1980 Winter Paralympics, at the 1984 Winter Paralympics and at the 1988 Winter Paralympics.

His win at the 1976 Alpine Combination IV B event formed part of a medal sweep as he won the gold medal and Adolf Hagn and Willi Berger, both representing Austria as well, won the silver and bronze medal respectively. He won a medal at every event that he competed in at the 1976 Winter Paralympics. He also won medals at the 1980 Winter Paralympics and the 1984 Winter Paralympics but not at the 1988 Winter Paralympics.

Achievements

See also 
 List of Paralympic medalists in alpine skiing

References

External links 
 

Living people
Year of birth missing (living people)
Place of birth missing (living people)
Paralympic alpine skiers of Austria
Paralympic cross-country skiers of Austria
Alpine skiers at the 1976 Winter Paralympics
Alpine skiers at the 1980 Winter Paralympics
Cross-country skiers at the 1980 Winter Paralympics
Cross-country skiers at the 1984 Winter Paralympics
Cross-country skiers at the 1988 Winter Paralympics
Medalists at the 1976 Winter Paralympics
Medalists at the 1980 Winter Paralympics
Medalists at the 1984 Winter Paralympics
Paralympic gold medalists for Austria
Paralympic silver medalists for Austria
Paralympic bronze medalists for Austria
Paralympic medalists in alpine skiing
Paralympic medalists in cross-country skiing
20th-century Austrian people